Arkadi Arshaviri Ghukasyan (born 22 June 1957) was the second President of the self-proclaimed Nagorno-Karabakh Republic. He was elected as the President on 8 September 1997 and re-elected in 2002, until his term ended on 7 September 2007 and was succeeded by Bako Sahakyan.

Biography 

Born in Stepanakert, in the Nagorno Karabakh Autonomous Republic of the Azerbaijan SSR on 22 June 1957, he graduated in 1979 from Yerevan State University with a degree in linguistics. He started his working career as a correspondent for "Soviet Karabagh" newspaper, becoming its Deputy Editor-in-Chief in 1981.

In 1991 Ghukasyan was elected to the first Parliament of the Nagorno-Karabakh Republic. In September 1992, he was appointed Political Adviser to the Chairman of the State Defense Committee (SDC), and headed the NKR delegations during OSCE negotiations with Azerbaijan.

Ghukasyan has been a member of Nagorno-Karabakh's Security Council since 1993. On 23 July 1993 he became the first Foreign Minister of the Nagorno-Karabakh Republic.

He survived an assassination attempt in 2000. Samvel Babayan, whom he had recently sacked as defence minister, was convicted of organising the attack and sentenced to 14 years in prison. Babayan was released from imprisonment on 18 September 2004 due to health concerns, with the terms of release including a probationary period and continued disenfranchisement.

In 2015, Ghukasyan founded the Artsakh Republican Party.

He has divorced once and remarried.

References

External links
 Official website (in Russian and Armenian)
Regions and territories: Nagorno-Karabakh

1957 births
Living people
People from Stepanakert
Heroes of Artsakh
Presidents of the Republic of Artsakh